Randy Dunton (born December 22, 1960) is a former head men's basketball coach at Liberty University.  He had been the assistant under head coach Jeff Meyer, who was subsequently let go in 1997.  Dunton was named the interim head coach for 1997–1998, a season that saw the Liberty Flames defeat in-state rival Virginia.  However, he was not offered a contract at the end of the season, and Mel Hankinson became the head coach.

Dunton later coached at Binghamton University as an assistant.  He was finally offered the head coaching position at Liberty University after the school suffered through four disappointing seasons under Hankinson.  Dunton brought in some junior college players and helped lead the team to a second-place finish in his first year back, and then Liberty won the Big South Conference championship and an NCAA Tournament berth in 2004.

However, his team slipped in subsequent years and did not have a winning record from 2004–05 to 2006–07. Dunton's contract was not renewed at the end of the 2006–07 season.

Dunton coached a U17 girls' basketball team in Brookville, Virginia, a team which feaincludedtured his daughter.  In January 2012, Randy became the women's basketball head at Virginia University of Lynchburg.

Head coaching record

References

1960 births
Living people
American men's basketball coaches
Binghamton Bearcats men's basketball coaches
Liberty Flames basketball coaches
Baptist Bible College (Missouri) alumni
Junior college men's basketball coaches in the United States